This is a list of Football clubs in Sierra Leone.
For a complete list see :Category:Football clubs in Sierra Leone

A
Anti Drugs Strikers

B
 Bai Bureh Warriors
Bintumani Scorpions
 Bo Rangers

C
 Central Parade

D
 Diamond Stars

E
 East End Lions
Easton Rangers

F
FC Johansen
Freetown City F.C.

G
Gem Stars F.C.
Goderich United
 Golden Dragon F.C.
 Golf Leopards

K
Kakua Rangers F.C.
 Kallon F.C.  formerly Real Republicans
 Kamboi Eagles

M
 Manchester City
 Mighty Blackpool
 Mount Aureol
Murray Town Rovers

N
 Nepean Stars

O
 Old Edwardians F.C.

P
 Ports Authority F.C.

R
Real Republicans F.C.
Regent Olympic F.C.
Republic of Sierra Leone Armed Forces FC

S 
Sierra Football Club

W
Waterloo Strikers
 Wellington People F.C.
 Wusum Stars

Y
Yambatui Stars

 
Sierra Leone
Football clubs
Football clubs